Humidity  is a 2016 Serbian drama film directed by Nikola Ljuca. It was named as one of five films that could be chosen as the Serbian submission for the Best Foreign Language Film at the 89th Academy Awards, but it was not selected.

Cast
 Miloš Timotijević as Petar
 Tamara Krcunović as Mina
 Maria Kraakman as Karin
 Slaven Došlo as Milan
 Dragan Bakema as Srdjan
 Katarina Marković as Bojana

References

External links
 

2016 films
2016 drama films
Serbian drama films
2010s Serbian-language films
Films set in Serbia
Films shot in Serbia